Manuel Diana Olaso (born 7 March 1996) is a Uruguayan rugby union player who generally plays as a number eight for the Toronto Arrows in Major League Rugby (MLR). He also represents Uruguay internationally.

Diana attended Stella Maris College and the University of Montevideo. He was included in the Uruguayan squad for the 2019 Rugby World Cup which was held in Japan for the first time and also marked his first World Cup appearance.

Career 
He made his international debut for Uruguay against Argentina XV on 11 February 2017.

References

External links

1996 births
Living people
Uruguayan rugby union players
Uruguay international rugby union players
Rugby union number eights
Rugby union players from Montevideo
Toronto Arrows players
Rugby union flankers
Peñarol Rugby players
People educated at Stella Maris College (Montevideo)
University of Montevideo alumni